Wilson railway station was a short-lived station at Wilson, Leicestershire, England.

History
It closed in June 1871.

Stationmaster
John Wickens ca. 1871

Route

References

Disused railway stations in Leicestershire
Former Midland Railway stations
Railway stations in Great Britain opened in 1869
Railway stations in Great Britain closed in 1871